, there were about 6,300 electric vehicles (including plug-in hybrid vehicles) in South Carolina.

Government policy
, the state government does not offer any tax incentives for electric vehicle purchases.

, the state government charges a $120 biennial registration fee for fully electric vehicles, and a $60 fee for plug-in hybrid vehicles.

Charging stations
, there were 384 public charging stations in South Carolina.

The Infrastructure Investment and Jobs Act, signed into law in November 2021, allocates  to charging stations in South Carolina.

By region

Charleston
, there were 8 public charging stations in Charleston.

Columbia
In 2022, Richland County School District One purchased the first electric school bus in South Carolina.

References

South Carolina
Road transportation in South Carolina